Idea Jalsa is a music reality series on Indian classical music aired on Zee TV. It is hosted by TV anchor Durga Jasraj and Annu Kapoor.

History
Idea Jalsa a brainchild of Durga Jasraj and Vikram Shankar, started on 17 February 2006, inaugurated by late President of indian, Dr. A P J Abdul Kalam. In 2008 idea jalsa became a morning music show on Doorddarshan. In 2011, Zee TV picked up the series, and in 2012, Zee TV USA picked up the series and is now aired in 165 countries..

The Show
Idea Jalsa is a national platform to talented youngsters, who get an opportunity to interact and share the stage with maestros and facilities for advance training. The show was organised across India by holding concerts in 12 cities.

It was also aired on regional channels of Doordarshan after its success.

Episodes
 Episode 1: Shivkumar Sharma
 Episode 2: Munnawar Masoom & Mohd. Vakil
 Episode 3: Shankar Mahadevan
 Episode 211: Jagjit Singh

References

Indian television series